The David Armstrong Extreme Park, formerly called the Louisville Extreme Park, is a 40,000 square foot (3,700 m²) public skatepark located near downtown Louisville, Kentucky, United States, in the Butchertown neighborhood. It opened on April 5, 2002, and gained national recognition after the release of Tony Hawk's Gigantic Skatepark Tour, in which the park was featured. The park is open 24 hours everyday, and was designed with the input of a local task force. The public skatepark is owned by Louisville Metro Government and operated by Metro Parks.

In 2014, about one-third of the park was demolished, to be followed by the rebuilding of facilities on adjacent property, to make way for flyover ramps to support the new Abraham Lincoln Bridge. The rebuild was completed on April 14, 2015, where the park was dedicated in former Louisville Mayor David L. Armstrong's honor.

Park features
The park is most often known for its  full pipe, but it also has an impressive set of other features including, two  bowls, two  bowls, two  bowls, a  bowl, a few fun boxes, a street course, a  flat bank, several ledges, rails, and endless lines. It also has a  wooden vert ramp with a  extension. There are also publicly accessible restrooms and emergency telephones.

See also
List of attractions and events in the Louisville metropolitan area
List of parks in the Louisville metropolitan area

References

External links
 

Parks in Louisville, Kentucky
Skateparks in the United States
Sports venues in Louisville, Kentucky
2002 establishments in Kentucky
Sports venues completed in 2002